Khaneqah (also Romanized as Khāneqāh and Khānaqāh; also known as Khanachev,  Khaneghah Dezmar, Khoinarev, and Khownāreh) is a village in Dizmar-e Sharqi Rural District, Minjavan District, Khoda Afarin County, East Azerbaijan Province, Iran. At the 2006 census, its population was 90, in 16 families. The village is populated by the Kurdish Mohammad Khanlu tribe.

References 

Populated places in Khoda Afarin County
Kurdish settlements in East Azerbaijan Province